Monzombo is a minor Ubangian language of the Congos.

There are three varieties, Monzombo (Mondjembo), Kpala (Kwala), and Yango, which Ethnologue lists separately. It is not clear how distinct they are.

References

Ngbaka languages
Languages of the Democratic Republic of the Congo
Languages of the Republic of the Congo